The 1990 European Super Cup was played between 1989–90 European Cup winners Milan and 1989–90 European Cup Winners' Cup winners Sampdoria, with Milan winning 3–1 on aggregate.

Milan chose to play their home leg away from their home city due to the poor condition of the turf at the San Siro Stadium, which had hosted several matches at the recent 1990 FIFA World Cup.

Match details

First leg

Second leg

See also
A.C. Milan in European football
Italian football clubs in international competitions
U.C. Sampdoria in European football

References

External links
UEFA Super Cup

Super Cup
1990
Super Cup 1990
Super Cup 1990
Super Cup 1990
European Super Cup
European Super Cup
Sports competitions in Genoa
20th century in Genoa
Sport in Bologna